Damon Reed Minor (born January 5, 1974) is a former professional baseball first baseman for the San Francisco Giants. He is the hitting coach for Triple A Sacramento River Cats (Class AAA PCL for San Francisco Giants)

Given the nickname "Tiny" by Barry Bonds because of his large frame, 6' 7" 230 lbs, Minor is currently a co-owner of Minor-Foral Baseball Academy, where he gives hitting lessons and coaches prep summer showcase teams.

College career
His best season came in 1996, when he batted .348 with 14 home runs and 62 RBI and was named an All-American Honorable Mention.

Minor leagues
Minor was drafted by the San Francisco Giants in the 12th round of the 1996 Major League Baseball Draft. He started his minor league career in 1996 with the Low-A Bellingham Giants. Minor split  between High-A San Jose and Double-A Shreveport. In , again with Shreveport, he hit 20 home runs and had 82 RBI.

 was Minor's career year. With Triple-A Fresno, he hit .290 with 30 home runs and 102 RBI, which was good enough for a September call-up to the Giants. In , he was again good as he hit .308 with 24 home runs and 71 RBI and was twice promoted to the majors. In , he played only 9 games in the minors as he spent time in the majors and on the disabled list. Minor struggled to begin  and on May 19, he was traded to the Philadelphia Phillies for minor leaguer Mike Wilson. Minor spent the rest of the year with the Phillies' Triple-A team, the Scranton/Wilkes-Barre Red Barons. He became a free agent at the end of the season. During the offseason, Minor had laser eye surgery and lost 30 pounds and on February 6, he re-signed with the Giants. He hit .302 for Fresno and again saw time in the majors. On November 17, 2004, he signed with the Pittsburgh Pirates, but was released just one month later before the season began.

Major leagues
Minor made his major league debut on September 2, for the San Francisco Giants, and appeared in 10 games that year. In , he played 19 games in the majors and spent most of the season with Triple-A Fresno. In , he spent nearly the entire year in the majors. In 83 games, Minor hit .237 with 10 home runs and 24 RBIs. He spent all of 2003 in the minors with the Giants' and Phillies' organizations.

Japan
In , Minor signed with the Tohoku Rakuten Golden Eagles of Japan's Nippon Professional Baseball, but was limited to 6 games because of injuries.

Post-playing career
In , Minor became a volunteer coach for his alma mater, the University of Oklahoma to help with their hitting. He currently resides in Edmond, Oklahoma. He co-owns a baseball academy and coaches a prep team.

Personal life
Minor's twin brother, Ryan, was also a Major League Baseball player for the Baltimore Orioles and Montreal Expos. They were teammates at Oklahoma from 1993 to 1995.

References

External links

1974 births
Living people
Algodoneros de Guasave players
American expatriate baseball players in Japan
American expatriate baseball players in Mexico
Baseball coaches from Ohio
Baseball players from Canton, Ohio
Bakersfield Blaze players
Bellingham Giants players
Fresno Grizzlies players
Major League Baseball first basemen
Mexican League baseball first basemen
Minor league baseball coaches
Nippon Professional Baseball first basemen
Oklahoma Sooners baseball players
Piratas de Campeche players
San Francisco Giants players
San Jose Giants players
Scranton/Wilkes-Barre Red Barons players
Shreveport Captains players
Sportspeople from Canton, Ohio
Tohoku Rakuten Golden Eagles players
Twin sportspeople
Anchorage Bucs players